Rhagium caucasicum is a species of beetle in the family Cerambycidae. It was described by Reitter in 1889.

References

Lepturinae
Beetles described in 1889